Ľubomír Pištej (born 6 March 1984) is a Slovak table tennis player. He competed in the 2020 Summer Olympics. From 2021 Is playing with Apuania Carrara Tennistavolo won Europe Cup, Coppa Italia, Supercoppa.

References

1984 births
Living people
Sportspeople from Prešov
Table tennis players at the 2020 Summer Olympics
Slovak male table tennis players
Olympic table tennis players of Slovakia
European Games competitors for Slovakia
Table tennis players at the 2019 European Games
20th-century Slovak people
21st-century Slovak people